Huttonella bicolor is a species of land snail in the family Streptaxidae known commonly as the two-toned gulella.

Description
The snail has an elongated shell up to 7.5 millimeters long by 2 millimeters wide. In life the shell is orange because the orange color of the body shows through; empty shells are white or pale brown. The shell is smooth with slight ribs at the sutures and larger ribs at the aperture. The aperture also has four teeth.

Distribution
The original native range of the snail is unclear, but it may have come from Asia or southern Africa. Today it has a broader distribution, having been widely introduced to other regions. It is known in the Caribbean, the southeastern United States, Central and South America, some Pacific Islands, and the Northern Territory in Australia.

Recent records include:
 Dominica, first reported in 2009.
 Brazil, first reported in 2008.
 Nicaragua
 Australia
 The Seychelles, introduced in the mid-19th century and first recorded in 1867.
 Mascarenes

Ecology
This carnivorous snail eats other snails, such as Subulina octona and species of the family Pupillidae.

References

Further reading

 Naggs, F. (1989). Gulella bicolor (Hutton) and its implications for the taxonomy of streptaxids. Journal of Conchology 33, 165–68.
 Stoliczka, F. (1871). Notes on terrestrial Mollusca from the neighbourhood of Moulmein, with descriptions of new species. J. Asiat. Soc. Beng. 40, 143–77.

Streptaxidae
Gastropods of Africa
Gastropods of Asia
Gastropods described in 1834